Earl is an unincorporated community in Las Animas County, in the U.S. state of Colorado.

History
A post office called Earl was established in 1895, and remained in operation until 1923. The community most likely bears the name of an early settler.

The Earl School, built in 1909 and apparently a rural schoolhouse, survives and was listed on the National Register of Historic Places in 2013.

References

Unincorporated communities in Las Animas County, Colorado
Unincorporated communities in Colorado